Claudio Santamaria is an Italian actor; in 2016 he was awarded the David di Donatello for Best Actor award for portraying the superhero Enzo 'Jeeg' Ceccotti in They Call Me Jeeg.

Career
His cinema debut came in 1997, with Leonardo Pieraccioni's Fuochi d'artificio. The first important film roles are with Gabriele Muccino's first film Ecco fatto, and in the films of Marco Risi's  L'ultimo capodanno and Bernardo Bertolucci's L'assedio.

He played the terrorist Carlos in Casino Royale. He was also the voice of Christian Bale in the Italian version of Batman Begins, The Dark Knight, The Dark Knight Rises and the voice of Eric Bana in Munich.

Filmography

Films

Television

Dubbing roles
 The Dark Knight Trilogy of Christopher Nolan films:
 Batman Begins, (2005)
 The Dark Knight (film), (2008)
 The Dark Knight Rises, (2012)
 Munich (2005)

Animation

Video games

External links 

Italian male film actors
Italian male voice actors
Living people
David di Donatello winners
Nastro d'Argento winners
Year of birth missing (living people)